Quark Software Inc. (founded 1981 in Denver, Colorado, USA) is a privately owned software company which specializes in enterprise publishing software for automating the production of customer communications. The company's original goal was to "create software that would be the platform for publishing", just as quarks are the basis for all matter. The company is best known for its desktop page layout and design software, QuarkXPress, although this has now become secondary to its  other products and services.

History
Quark was founded with $2,000 in 1981 in Denver, Colorado, U.S. Between 1981 and 1985, their primary products were Word Juggler and Catalyst. Word Juggler was the first word processor on the Apple III. Catalyst was a program that was distributed bundled with the Apple IIe, and allowed users to run floppy disk-based applications from their hard drive. They also attempted a product line called "Quark Peripherals", but the market for storage devices at the time resulted in a huge financial loss. The device released, the "QC10", was a 10MB hard disk drive that could be used with the Apple IIe or IIc, the Apple /// or III+, or the Macintosh. In October 1985, it retailed for US$1,295.00.

In March 1987, Quark released QuarkXPress 1.0, which due to its precision quickly gained market share from Aldus PageMaker. With the release of QuarkXPress 3.0 in 1990, Quark quickly achieved a dominant position in the desktop publishing market and became the standard for desktop publishing. By the end of the 1990s, it had gathered a market share of around 90%.

In the late 1990s, Quark faced intense criticism for slow innovation cycles, high prices, and a poor response to customer needs. Therefore, many customers welcomed the release of Adobe InDesign in 1999 as a viable alternative. The release of Adobe Creative Suite in 2003, essentially including InDesign with Photoshop and Illustrator, resulted in ongoing market share loss for QuarkXPress.

As a result, under the new leadership of Raymond Schiavone, Quark started to refocus its resources towards the enterprise dynamic publishing market (now Content Automation), announcing a new strategy in March 2008.

Ownership and management
Quark was founded under the name "Quark Engineering" in 1981 by Tim Gill and Mark Pope. In 1986, Fred Ebrahimi joined Quark as CEO and co-owner. In 1990, Mark Pope sold his share of the company to the other partners. In 2000, Tim Gill left Quark and sold all his shares to Ebrahimi.

In keeping with its India focus, Quark appointed Kamar Aulakh, a Quark veteran of Indian origin, as its CEO in February, 2004. In June 2005, Quark informed its employees that Aulakh was no longer with the company.

At the end of 2006, Fred Ebrahimi gave all his shares of Quark Inc. to his children, with his daughter Sasha Ebrahimi taking the position of chairman.

On November 1, 2006, Quark appointed Raymond Schiavone, former CEO of Arbortext, as its new CEO.

On August 9, 2011, the Ebrahimi family sold all their shares to Platinum Equity, a California-based private equity firm.

Parallax Capital Partners subsequently acquired Quark Software Inc. from Platinum Equity on July 12, 2017, stating their intentions to invest in growing the company's new content automation business through organic growth and acquisitions.

On June 1, 2021, Quark appointed Martin Owen, former SVP of Products at Erwin (now Quest Software), as its new CEO.

Products
Quark's first products were word processing software for the Apple II and Apple III. In 1987, it released its best known product, QuarkXPress, for Apple Macintosh.  In 1992, it also released the product for Microsoft Windows.

In the 1990s, QuarkXPress 3.x gained around 90% market share of page layout applications. Its editorial workflow system, called Quark Publishing System, sold almost a thousand times to magazines and newspapers.

The company announced a picture editing application, QuarkXPosure, which was never released, and a multimedia authoring add-on XTension for QuarkXPress, QuarkImmedia. Neither is part of Quark's portfolio anymore. The company briefly purchased and marketed a standalone multimedia authoring program, mTropolis, before discontinuing it in the late 1990s.

Quark acquired two companies creating add-ons for QuarkXPress and InDesign, ALAP in 2005 and Gluon in 2010.

In March 2008, Quark announced a new direction. 
Quark acquired an XML editor vendor in 2008, a company called In.vision Research.

On May 29, 2012, Quark acquired Mobile IQ, with digital publishing technology for tablet devices named PressRun, later renamed to App Studio.

Reflecting a shift towards Web-based word-processing tools such as Office 365 and Google Docs, in November 2014, Quark announced the release of a new authoring tool, Quark Author.

In November 2017, Quark announced the acquisition of New York-based company Docurated. Docurated develops a Cloud Sales Enablement Platform to enable sales teams to rapidly access and share sales content with their prospects.

References

External links 

Graphic design
Software companies based in Colorado
Companies based in Denver
Software companies established in 1981
Privately held companies based in Colorado
Tim Gill